Contini is an Italian surname that may refer to

Alberto Contini, Italian musician
Alfio Contini (born 1927), Italian cinematographer
Alessandro Contini-Bonacossi (1878–1955), Italian politician, art collector, dealer and philatelist
Barbara Contini (born 1961), Italian politician
Carl Contini (born 1970), birth name Carl Ognibene, best known as Carl Malenko, American professional wrestler, and MMA artist
Edoardo Contini (born 1955), Italian mafia boss
Ellen Contini-Morava, American anthropological linguist
Gavino Contini (1860–1915), Sardinian poet
Gianfranco Contini (1912–1990), Italian academic and philologist
Giorgio Contini (born 1974), Swiss footballer
Giovanni Battista Contini (1641–1723), Italian architect
Joe Contini (born 1957), Canadian ice hockey forward
Lucia Contini Anselmi (1876– after 1913), Italian pianist and composer
Marcelo Contini (born 1989), Brazilian judoka
Matteo Contini (born 1980), Italian football defender
Michel Contini (1937), Sardinian, naturalized French linguist, researcher and academic
Nikita Contini Baranovsky (born 1996), Italian footballer
Sabine Contini (born c. 1970), Italian figure skater
Silvano Contini (born 1958), Italian road bicycle race

See also
Contini clan
A. Contini & Son

Italian-language surnames